Alguien que cuide de mí is a 2023 Spanish film directed and written by Daniela Fejerman and Elvira Lindo which stars Aura Garrido and Emma Suárez.

Plot 
Set in Madrid, the plot follows the fraught relation between three generations of thespians: Nora, her mother Cecilia, and her grandmother Magüi, underscored by a big secret withheld by Cecilia from Nora.

Cast

Production 
The film is based on an original story by Elvira Lindo tentatively titled Lo que nunca te dije. It was produced by Tornasol Media and Lo que nunca te dije AIE, with the participation of RTVE, and Movistar Plus+, help from the Government of Navarre and support from ICAA. It was shot from April to May 2022 primarily in Pamplona, Navarre.

Release 
Alguien que cuide de mí premiered as the opening film of the 26th Málaga Film Festival's official selection (out of competition) on 10 March 2023. Distributed by A Contracorriente Films, it is scheduled to be released theatrically in Spain on 28 April 2023.

See also  
 List of Spanish films of 2023

References 

Tornasol Films films
2020s Spanish-language films
2020s Spanish films
Spanish comedy-drama films
Films shot in Navarre
Films set in Madrid
Films about actors